The Cairo I-57 Bridge is a steel through arch bridge carrying 4 lanes of Interstate 57 across the Mississippi River at Cairo, Illinois. It was opened in 1978.

See also
 
 
 
 
 List of crossings of the Upper Mississippi River

References

External links
 I-57 Bridge at johnweeks.com

Through arch bridges in the United States
Bridges on the Interstate Highway System
Road bridges in Illinois
Bridges over the Mississippi River
Cairo, Illinois
Bridges completed in 1978
Bridges in Alexander County, Illinois
Buildings and structures in Mississippi County, Missouri
Road bridges in Missouri
Interstate 57
Steel bridges in the United States
Interstate vehicle bridges in the United States